Amanda Reason (born August 22, 1993) is a Canadian breaststroke swimmer and a former world-record holder in the 50-metre breaststroke (long course).

Career
On July 8, 2009, Reason burst onto the international scene when she posted a 30.23 world record time for the 50-metre breaststroke. Reason is the first Canadian female to break a world record in a long course pool since Allison Higson accomplished the feat in the 200-metre breaststroke in 1988. At the 2009 World Aquatics Championships, Reason finished seventh in the 50-metre breaststroke.  Reason qualified for the 2012 Summer Olympics in London, with her teammate, Brittany MacLean.  She also competed for the Canadian women's 4x200-metre freestyle relay team that finished fourth with a time of 7.50.65.

See also
 World record progression 50 metres breaststroke

References

1993 births
Living people
Canadian female breaststroke swimmers
Olympic swimmers of Canada
Swimmers from Toronto
Sportspeople from Scarborough, Toronto
Swimmers at the 2012 Summer Olympics
World record setters in swimming
21st-century Canadian women